Papoli-ye Olya (also Romanized as Pāpolī-ye ‘Olyā; also known as Pāpolī-ye Bālā) is a village in Zahray-ye Bala Rural District, in the Central District of Buin Zahra County, Qazvin Province, Iran. At the 2006 census, its population was 30, in 8 families.

References 

Populated places in Buin Zahra County